Comanche County Courthouse may refer to:

Comanche County Courthouse (Kansas), Coldwater, Kansas
First Comanche County Courthouse, Comanche, Texas
Comanche County Courthouse (Texas), Comanche, Texas